Henrique IV or Tekenge was regent of the Portuguese vassal of the Kingdom of Kongo from 1896 until 1901, when his nephew Pedro VI rose to majority.

References

Manikongo of Kongo